The 2020–21 NK Istra 1961 season was the club's 60th season in existence and the 12th consecutive season in the top flight of Croatian football.

First-team squad

Transfers

In

Source: Glasilo Hrvatskog nogometnog saveza

Out

Source: Glasilo Hrvatskog nogometnog saveza

Total spending:  0 €

Total income:  122,000 €

Total expenditure:  122,000 €

Competitions

Overview

HT Prva liga

League table

Results summary

Results by round

Matches

Source: Croatian Football Federation

Croatian Football Cup

Source: Croatian Football Federation

Player seasonal records
Updated 23 May 2021

Goals

Source: Competitive matches

Clean sheets

Source: Competitive matches

Disciplinary record

Appearances and goals

Notes

References

External links

NK Istra 1961 seasons
Istra 1961